Adarei Man is a 2018 Sri Lankan Sinhala romance film directed by Prageeth Rathnayake as his maiden direction and produced by Jagath Chandana for Romeo's Eye Picture. It stars director Prageeth Rathnayake himself with Chathurika Pieris in lead roles along with Robin Fernando and Chamila Pieris. Music composed by veteran artist Victor Rathnayake.

The Muhurath ceremony of the film was celebrated at the Bellanvila Raja Maha Viharaya. Shooting was taken place around Colombo. The first screening was screened at Regal Theatre, Colombo. It is the 1294th Sri Lankan film in the Sinhala cinema.

Plot
It is the love tale of a wealthy kind hearted boy named Pavan (played by Prageeth) and his relation with a middle-class girl Malmi (played by Chathurika). Their parents refuse their affair due to family status. With that, they married secretly with the help of friends.

Cast
 Prageeth Rathnayake as Pavan 
 Chathurika Pieris as Malmi
 Robin Fernando as Mr. S.W. Jayawardena, Pavan's father
 Chamila Pieris as Sakunthala
 Nadeeka Gunasekara 
 Neil Allas as Malmi's father
 Nayana Rambukkanage as Malmi's mother
 Buddhika Indurugolla as Pavan's brother-in-law
 T. B. Ekanayake
 Sanju Rodrigo
 Vishaka Jayaweera

Songs

References

External links
 

2018 films
2010s Sinhala-language films